Annandale Plantation was a cotton plantation worked by enslaved laborers in what is now the Mannsdale neighborhood of Madison, Mississippi.  

Its Italianate-style plantation house was designed and built for Margaret Louisa Thompson Johnstone, the wealthy widow of John T. Johnstone.  Completed during the late 1850s, it was destroyed in a fire during the mid-1920s.  A replacement, part of a modern residential development, was later built at the site during the mid-20th century.  

Before the new mansion was built, Mrs. Johnstone commissioned what is known as the Chapel of the Cross, in memory of her late husband. This Gothic Revival-style structure was completed in 1852 on the plantation property. Johnstone deeded it and 10 acres to the Episcopal Diocese. The chapel was added to the National Register of Historic Places in 1972.

History
John Taylor Johnstone, born on April 28, 1801, migrated with his family to Mississippi from Hillsborough, North Carolina, about 1820. He eventually obtained a number of farms totaling  and became wealthy by planting and harvesting cotton.

The Johnstones had two daughters, Frances Ann and Helen Scrymgeour Johnstone, and two sons, Samuel and Noah Thompson Johnstone. Both sons died in 1840, the year the family moved to Mannsdale. 

The first Johnstone home on the Annandale plantation was a large log house. Family tradition maintained that Johnstone was descended from the Johnstone family who once held the title Earl of Annandale and Hartfell in the Peerage of Scotland and that he named his plantation in their honor. When Frances Johnstone married William J. Britton in 1844, her father built a plantation house near Mannsdale for the couple as a gift.
John T. Johnstone died on April 23, 1848. In memory of her late husband, Margaret Johnstone built the masonry Gothic Revival-style Chapel of the Cross on the plantation property, quarter-mile north of the site of the future Annandale mansion.  After its completion in 1852, she transferred ownership of the church and surrounding  to the newly created Episcopal Diocese of Mississippi. The Chapel was assessed under the Historic American Buildings Survey in the twentieth century and added to the National Register of Historic Places in 1972.

A few years later, Mrs. Johnstone hired the architect Jacob Lamour from New York City to design a new mansion for her and her unmarried daughter, Helen. He adapted the design from a plan in Minard Lafever's Architectural Instructor, published in 1856.  Construction of the grand three-story, 40-room mansion in the Italianate mode began in mid-1857 and was completed in 1859. It featured one-story arched arcades that encircled the entire structure and spacious interior hallways, providing abundant shade and ventilation.

Helen Johnstone was engaged to be married in 1857 to Henry Grey Vick, descended from the founder of Vicksburg. Their wedding was set for May 21, 1859, but Vick was killed in a duel in Mobile, Alabama, on May 17, 1859.  Helen later married the Rev. George Carroll Harris, an Episcopal priest, in 1862.

During the American Civil War, Margaret Johnstone cared for sick and wounded Confederate soldiers and supplied money and material to the military. She died at Annandale on March 16, 1880.  The plantation was sold after her death.

George and Helen Johnstone Harris moved around while he served as an Episcopal priest, but eventually the couple built a grand house for their retirement, Mont Helena, in Rolling Fork.  Situated atop an ancient platform mound, the -story mansion was built on land left to Helen by her family.

The Britton home, Ingleside, burned down in 1906, and Frances Johnstone Britton died on March 24, 1907.  Her sister Helen Johnstone Harris died on November 19, 1917.  The Annandale mansion, then unoccupied, was destroyed in a fire on September 9, 1924.  A Classical Revival-style replacement is at the site of the former mansion.

The former  plantation is now divided between two gated residential developments: Annandale Estates on the west side of Mannsdale Road and Reunion on the east.  Each has its own golf club, also on the former plantation lands, known as the Annandale Golf Club and the Reunion Golf and Country Club.

Folklore
Annandale Plantation has two ghost stories associated with it that have been published in at least two books.  One, "The Ghosts of Annandale", in Jeffrey Introduces 13 More Southern Ghosts by Kathryn Tucker Windham details the supposed hauntings.  One ghost is claimed in the story to be that of Annie Devlin, a former governess for Helen who died at the Annandale mansion in June 1860 and was purported to haunt its halls until the night it burned in 1924. The other is reportedly that of Helen Johnstone.  The story claims that the ghost of Helen now weeps at the grave of Henry Vick, her former fiancé, in the churchyard of the Chapel of the Cross.

See also 
 Robert O. Wilder Building: an extant Italianate house also designed by Jacob Lamour

References

History of slavery in Mississippi
Plantations in Mississippi
Plantation houses in Mississippi
Houses in Madison County, Mississippi
Houses completed in 1859
Demolished buildings and structures in Mississippi
Antebellum architecture
1924 fires in the United States
Italianate architecture in Mississippi
Burned houses in the United States
1859 establishments in Mississippi
Buildings and structures demolished in 1924
1924 disestablishments in Mississippi
Cotton plantations in Mississippi